Events from the year 1779 in art.

Events
October 8 – William Blake enrols as a student with the Royal Academy of Arts at Somerset House in London.

Paintings

 Per Krafft the Elder – Carl Michael Bellman
 David Martin – Dido Elizabeth Belle Lindsay and Lady Elizabeth Murray
 Charles Willson Peale – George Washington at Princeton
 Sir Joshua Reynolds
 Lady Elizabeth Delmé and Her Children
 Lady Jane Halliday
 Admiral Lord Keppel (National Portrait Gallery, London)
 George Stubbs
 The Labourers
 A Lion and a Tiger
 Mambrino

Births
 January 3 – Gustav Philipp Zwinger, German painter (died 1819)
 February 20 – Augustus Wall Callcott, English landscape painter (died 1844)
 March 21 – Vojtěch Benedikt Juhn, Czech painter and engraver (died 1843)
 April 19 - Anson Dickinson, American painter of miniature portraits (died 1852)
 May 27 – Juan Antonio Ribera, Spanish Neoclassicism painter (died 1860)
 July 8 – Giorgio Pullicino, Maltese painter and architect (died 1851)
 July 26 – Erik Gustaf Göthe, Swedish sculptor (died 1838)
 August 24 – Charles Norris, English topographical etcher and writer known for his landscape work of the Welsh countryside (died 1858)
 November 4 – Jan Willem Pieneman, Dutch historical painter (died 1853)
 November 5 – Washington Allston, American painter, the "American Titian" (died 1843)
 November 6 – Henry Pierce Bone, English enamel painter (died 1855)
 December 9 – Moritz Retzsch, German painter and etcher (died 1857)
 date unknown
 Paolo Caronni, Italian engraver (died 1842)
 Guillaume Descamps, French painter and engraver (died 1858)
 Vasily Demut-Malinovsky, Russian sculptor in the Empire style (died 1846)

Deaths
 January 26 – Thomas Hudson, English portrait painter (born 1701)
 February 4 – John Hamilton Mortimer, English Neoclassical painter known primarily for his romantic paintings and pieces set in Italy and its countryside (born 1740)
 March 14 – Joseph-Charles Roettiers, French engraver and medallist (born 1689)
 April – Károly Bebo, Hungarian sculptor, builder and decorator noted for his stucco work (born 1712)
 June 29 – Anton Raphael Mengs, German painter (born 1728)
 September 14 – Anton Pichler, Austrian goldsmith and engraver (born 1697)
 December 6 – Jean-Baptiste-Siméon Chardin, French painter (born 1699)
 date unknown
 John Giles Eccardt, German-born English portrait painter (died 1779)
 Lorenzo Feliciati, Italian painter (born 1732)

 
Years of the 18th century in art
1770s in art